The Battle of Arronches was an encounter between the forces of the Portuguese Empire and of the Spanish Empire in 1653, near Arronches, Alentejo. The Portuguese, significantly outnumbered, managed to outflank the Spanish forces and defeat them badly.

References

Battles involving Portugal
Battles involving Spain
Battles of the Portuguese Restoration War
1653 in Portugal
Conflicts in 1653